Kathryn Casey is an American writer of mystery novels and non-fiction books. She is best known for writing She Wanted It All, which recounts the case of Celeste Beard, who married an Austin multimillionaire only to convince her lesbian lover, Tracey Tarlton, to kill him.

Early life and education
In 1980, Casey moved with her husband to Texas. She attended the University of Houston and earned a degree in journalism.

Career
In 1984, Casey began writing as an intern at the now-defunct Houston City Magazine. She left two years later as a senior editor. She then worked for two years as editor of Ultra, a regional magazine geared toward wealthy Texans.

Casey wrote for Ladies' Home Journal, where she was a contributing editor for 18 years, as well as More (magazine), TV Guide, Rolling Stone, Seventeen, Reader's Digest, and Texas Monthly. During her years as a magazine journalist, Casey interviewed celebrities in the movie, television, and recording industry, plus presidents and first ladies. She covered subjects ranging from the Oklahoma City bombing, the aftermath of 9/11, and Hurricane Katrina, to infertility and the McCaughey Septuplets.

Casey's articles often examined sensational crimes. In the early 1990s, one case she covered for Ladies' Home Journal bout a serial rapist attacking Houston-area women, resulted in her first book, The Rapist's Wife. After its release, Casey concentrated on writing nonfiction, fact-based crime books.

Her seventh true-crime book covered the Matt Baker case in Waco, Texas, about the Baptist minister who was convicted of killing his wife and staging it to look like a suicide. Baker, sentenced to 65 years, resides in the Allan B. Polunsky Unit, a Texas state prison. Cy-Fair Magazine, upon the July 2012 release of the book Deadly Little Secrets, covered the Baker case and others in a feature article about Casey. The Houston Chronicle also covered the release of the book. Deadly Little Secrets was the inspiration for the film Sins of the Preacher, which aired on the Lifetime television network in September 2013.

Casey then turned to crime fiction. In 2009, Booklist, the publication of the American Library Association, named Casey's debut novel, Singularity, one of the "Best Crime Novel Debuts of 2009" on its Bestseller Lists. The main character in her mystery series is Sarah Armstrong, a Texas Ranger and a criminal profiler. In Singularity, Armstrong travels across Texas hunting a serial killer. Library Journal picked the third in the series, The Killing Storm, as a best book of 2010 in its mystery category.

Casey's 11th book, Deliver Us, released January 2015 by HarperCollins, is based on murders along the Texas Killing Fields and Interstate 45. In March 2014, Elle Magazine included Casey along with Agatha Christie, Jane Smiley, Edna Buchanan, Joyce Carol Oates, Gillian Flynn, Ann Rule and others, in a list of "The Ten Best Thrillers and Crime Writing by Women."

Casey was a co-founder of Women in Crime Ink, which has been described by the Wall Street Journal as "a blog worth reading."

In July 2011, she wrote an article for Forbes Woman about new options available to authors with the advent of eBooks and self-publishing.

Author Ann Rule called her "one of the best in the true crime genre."

Personal life 
She lives in Houston, Texas, with her husband.

Appearances
In 1995, Casey appeared on The Oprah Winfrey Show to discuss The Rapist's Wife along with the subject in the title, Linda Bergstrom. In the years since, Casey has appeared on Oprah Winfrey's Oxygen Network, Court TV, Biography, Nancy Grace, E! Network, Investigation Discovery and the A&E.

In October 2006, she appeared on The Montel Williams Show to discuss women who unknowingly dated wanted criminals.

She appeared in ABC's 20/20 November 2022 episode "Tainted Love" about the murder of millionaire businessman Steve Beard at the hands of his younger wife Celeste Beard.

Casey was featured in the 2022 Netflix documentary miniseries Crime Scene: The Texas Killing Fields, directed by Jessica Dimmock.

She speaks at book festivals and events, including the Texas Library Association convention, Southwest Louisiana Writer's Conference, Pulpwood Queens Girlfriend Weekend book conference, and the Texas Book Festival.

Books

True Crime
 A Warrant to Kill (2000 HarperCollins))
 She Wanted It All (2005 Avon Books)
 A Descent into Hell (2008 HarperCollins)
 Die, My Love (2007 HarperCollins)
 Evil Beside Her (2008 HarperCollins) reissue of The Rapist's Wife
 Shattered (2010 HarperCollins)
 Murder, I Write (2011 Crime Rant Classics)
 Deadly Little Secrets (2012 HarperCollins)
 Deliver Us: Three Decades of Murder and Redemption in the Infamous I-45/Texas Killing Fields (2015 HarperCollins)
 Possessed: The Infamous Texas Stiletto Murder (2016 William Morrow)
 In Plain Sight: The Kaufman County Prosecutor Murders (2018 William Morrow)

Sarah Armstrong Mystery Series
 Singularity (2008 St. Martin's Minotaur, 1st in series)
 Blood Lines (2009 St Martin's Minotaur, 2nd in series)
 The Killing Storm (November 2010 St. Martin's Minotaur, 3rd in series)
 The Buried (November 2018, 4th in series)

Clara Jefferies Mystery Series
 The Fallen Girls (2020 Hachette, 1st in series)
 Her Final Prayer (2020 Hachette, 2nd series) 
 The Blessed Bones (2021 Hachette, 3rd series)

References

External links
Author's official web site

Living people
American women bloggers
American bloggers
American non-fiction crime writers
21st-century American novelists
American mystery writers
American magazine editors
Novelists from Texas
Journalists from Houston
University of Houston alumni
Year of birth missing (living people)
American women journalists
Women mystery writers
American women novelists
21st-century American women writers
21st-century American non-fiction writers
Women magazine editors